is a video game developed by Namco Bandai Games for the Mitsubishi P904i series of mobile phones for NTT Docomo.  It was released in June 2007 in Japan.  It is a spin-off of the Katamari Damacy series, the second game on a handheld game console and the third game produced without the involvement of series creator Keita Takahashi.

This version of the game uses a unique method of control, by making use of a new software technology called GestureTek EyeMobile to make phones capable of detecting tilt and vibration via the built in camera on the P904i.  The player moves the katamari ball forward, backwards, left and right by tilting the phone.

There are traditional controls as an option to the default motion controls.

Katamari Damacy Mobile came pre-installed on P904i model phones. Other phone models needed to download the game through the Bandai Namco Games channel.

Gameplay
In Katamari Damacy Mobile, the player controls a highly–adhesive ball called the katamari. The object is to make the katamari as large as possible by running over and collecting objects of increasing size. The more objects players collect, the larger the katamari becomes. Instead of using analog controllers to control the katamari as in the home console Katamari games, players roll the katamari by tilting the phone in the direction they want the katamari to go.

Criticism
Many have noted similarities between the 904i series of phones using motion controls similar to the Wii Remote.

Docomo's 904i series, however, calculates tilt based on digital camera images; unlike the Wii and PS3 controllers which use different motion sensing technologies.

An IGN review of EyeMobile-compatible 3D Tilt-a-World warns that this type of motion control fails "if your movements are too sudden for the game to translate" and that the setup requires "a well-lit area so the camera can get a good 'fix' on an image".

References

External links
Katamari Mobile & P904i Info & Videos
IGN Game Page
Joystiq article announcement
DoKoMo's Official Website

Mobile
Namco games
Mobile games
Bandai Visual
2007 video games
Puzzle video games
Video games developed in Japan